X-Nation 2099 was a comic book series created by Marvel Comics for their Marvel 2099 imprint. It depicts the course of events in a team of young mutants' lives. The series only lasted six issues.

Fictional team biography
In the year 2099, Victor Von Doom approached Cerebra of the X-Men with a proposition. He told her that through a mathematical probability program he had deduced that there would be a mutant Messiah in the next generation, and he offered her the position of finding it for him. Cerebra agreed and left the X-Men in search of this figure who would lead all of mutantkind into a golden age. She began finding candidates and bringing them to the Xavier Center, which was watched over by a militant sect of nuns named the Sisters of the Howling Commandments. She was aided, albeit unwillingly, by Morphine Somers, former Minister of Humanity and interim liaison to Halo City while Doom was still President.

The group's first adventure, like most in the short run of the series, begins with them sneaking out of the Xavier Home. After a night hanging out at the local Milk Bar, they end up fighting the Wild Boys, a gang of young mutants that Wulff used to belong to. They escape and return home, but are then forced to do construction work as punishment for sneaking out. While serving their punishment they are attacked by bounty hunters from the "Million Palms" Amusement Park, a place ruled over by the villain Avian, which once held December and Willow prisoner. The team fights together to fend off the attack, but when the smoke clears they notice that Willow is gone.

Once again, the teens leave the shelter to confront Avian and rescue Willow, but they are captured as they enter Million Palms. There they meet Metalsmith, another young mutant, and find out that Avian is also searching for the mutant messiah, under the command of Doom's enemy John Herod. With the timely arrival of Willow, X-Nation escapes and heads back home. Meanwhile, the shelter is attacked by Atlantean soldiers.  The sisters beat them back but are eventually defeated. The teens arrive back home just in time to see it explode.

Without a home and with floodwaters rising from the melting of the polar ice caps, X-Nation turns to the newly arrived Exodus, who promises to lead them into a new era of power. Cerebra battles the telepath who shows his true colors, wanting to help mutants rise up to rule over humans. In the final battle Clarion sacrifices himself to destroy Exodus and the remaining members of X-Nation evacuate to the Savage Land with the rest of humanity to escape the floods and the coming of the Phalanx.

At the start of the new imprint, 2099: World of Tomorrow, X-Nation is split.  December, Twilight and Metalsmith join Father Jennifer D'Angelo and Ben Grimm in a trip to the Alchemax Mars colony to see if it is possible for the remaining residents of Earth to relocate to Mars. There they meet Dr. Isaacs, Clarion's mother (though it is never shown that the others make this connection), and the resident martians, known as the Takers. It is revealed that several years prior the Phalanx decimated Mars, killing most of the Takers, leaving only a dozen or less. Smith and Twilight travel with them on a rocket ship, landing on the Phalanx planetoid that is trying to assimilate Earth and battle to destroy the Phalanx. From Earth, the semi-sentient database robot built by Reed Richards uplinks to the collective and dubs their plan to destroy all human life as "evil". As such he triggers the self-destruct sequence of the planetoid and it explodes, killing the remaining Takers as well as Smith and Twilight. December and Dr. Isaacs are left on Mars to mourn the loss. It is also revealed that Dr. Isaacs had cloned Clarion before leaving for the Mars project, but none of the clones survived.

Meanwhile, Wulff and Uproar traveled with the others to Humanity's Last Refuge, a new colony in the Savage Land. After hearing a rumor about the Wild Boys they stow away on a ship bearing Spider-Man to Latveria.  The ship is destroyed and they are pulled from the water by an armada of roaming ships belonging to the Vulture, leader of the Wild Boys. Uproar is forced to fight in the Gauntlet, brutal kill or be killed games used as entertainment. Though he continues winning he is kept captive because he refuses to kill his opponent. Wulff is imprisoned and through torture is reverted to a feral were-wolf creature. Together they escape and destroy the armada.  This leaves them adrift in the middle of the ocean, where they part ways.

The final 2 members, Nostromo and Willow, join the X-pedition team at the Last Refuge, traveling underground with La Lunatica, Bloodhawk, Jade Ryuteki, Drew Hodge and Mr. Winn to search for supplies and explore the surrounding terrain. They come upon a crashed spaceship, but accidentally set off a self-destruct program.  Willow morphs into the dead alien to stop the self-destruct, but is unable to revert to her human form. She attacks Winn but is able to regain control of herself. Nostromo then reveals himself to be the Phalanx Scout, while Winn is also revealed to be a Phalanx agent. Winn takes Nostromo to Latveria to uplink with the collective while the others return to the surface and battle a Phalanx Dread Node, as it attempts to assimilate the Savage Land. Nostromo is linked with the Phalanx, however the intervention of Doom, who had known about the scout program since the Phalanx invasion of the 20th century, activated a hidden subroutine in his programming that broke him free of the collective. As he escaped with Spider-Man and Xina Kwan, Doom sacrificed himself to destroy the rest of the Phalanx presence on Earth. As the Phalanx threat abated, Doom's final will named Nostromo as heir to the throne of Latveria.

Members

Supporting cast
 Cerebra – A founding member of the X-Men 2099. Doom put Cerebra in charge of his "Mutant Messiah" hunt, and therefore in charge of training them. Her Mutant power allows her to detect nearby mutants and telepathically control the nervous system of other beings.
 Morphine Somers – Doom's Minister of Humanity and interim liaison to Halo City; later ousted when his bid to be elected to the Halo City counsel failed. Morphine convinced Wulff to join X-Nation, thereby inserting himself as Cerebra's assistant.
 Sister Nicholas – A militaristic nun who lived in Halo City with her cloister, the Sisters of the Howling Commandments, a pun on Nick Fury's Howling Commandos.

There were plans to add two more members to X-Nation 2099, but the plans were scrapped when Tom Peyer and Humberto Ramos left the book within the first three issues. Despite appearing on both the cover of the first issue and the Warren Ellis special 2099: Genesis, the characters were never formally introduced within the book's storyline and thus are apparently non-canon. Only one of them was named — an Indian mutant named Caravan — but his powers were never explained.

References

1996 comics debuts
Marvel 2099 titles
Marvel 2099 characters
Marvel Comics superhero teams
X-Men titles